François Blanchetière is a French New Testament scholar. He is known for his view on continuity between Second Temple period Judaism and Jewish Christianity and considers that Jesus cannot be considered as a "founder" of a religion. Blanchetière considers that "Nazarene" religion was a religious movement of Semitic character within Judaism. His position is often linked to that of Simon Claude Mimouni.

References 

Living people
Year of birth missing (living people)
French biblical scholars
French historians of religion